The Chamber of Peers was the upper house of the French parliament from 1814 to 1848.

History 
The Peerage of France was recreated by the Charter of 1814 at the same time as the Bourbon Restoration, albeit on a different basis from that of the ancien regime before 1789. A new Chamber of Peers was created which was similar to the British House of Lords, and it met at the Palais du Luxembourg. This new Chamber of Peers acted as the upper house of the French parliament. Like the House of Lords, the Chamber of Peers also had a judicial function, being authorized to judge peers and other prominent people. As such, it sentenced Marshal Ney to death. 

To begin with, the Chamber had 154 members, including the holders of all surviving pre-Revolutionary ecclesiastical (Reims, Langres, and Châlons) and lay peerages, except for the Duchy of Aubigny, which was held by a foreigner, the British Duke of Richmond. Thirteen peers were also prelates. 

New members were appointed by the French king, without limit on their numbers. Such a peerage was either granted for life or was heritable, at the king's will. All men of the royal family and all descendants in the male line of previous kings (princes du sang) were members of the chamber by birth (pairs-nés), but nevertheless needed explicit permission from the king to sit at each session of the chamber.

At the outset comprising only hereditary peers and certain prelates of the church, the Chamber became a body to which men were appointed for life following the July Revolution of 1830. In the Revolution of 1848, the Chamber of Peers was disbanded and the peerage of France was abolished.

Famous members

See also
Chamber of Most Worthy Peers
House of Lords

External links 
 French Senat | La Chambre des Pairs de la Restauration
 French Senat | La Chambre des Pairs de la Monarchie de Juillet
 University of Cambridge | Institution French Chamber of Peers

 
Defunct upper houses
Government of France
French monarchy
1814 establishments in France
1848 disestablishments in France

Historical legislatures in France